The Birotron (pronounced by-ro-tron) is a tape replay keyboard conceived by American musician and inventor Dave Biro of Yalesville, Connecticut, US, and funded by English keyboardist Rick Wakeman in the 1970s, and Rudkin-Wiley of Pepperidge Farm Foods (under Campbell's Soup company) and Air Shield in the early 1980s.

A Mellotron-like instrument in the prototype stage and intended for mass production, it was featured on several albums and tours. It appeared in advertisements and received press in several newspapers as the next "latest and greatest" keyboard instrument. It also received over 1,000 advance orders (totalling over 1 million dollars in sales) from many prominent musicians worldwide, including members of The Beatles and Led Zeppelin.

Despite this success, it is now generally considered the world's rarest keyboard instrument in the genres of pop/rock music. It also retains the highest selling price for any Mellotron related keyboard, and since its inception, has been one of the most difficult to find, seldom seen, and least recorded instruments in the entire world.

Technology 
The Birotron is a keyboard instrument that uses 8-track cartridge tapes to play sounds whenever a key is pressed on the keyboard. It is similar in concept to the Chamberlin and Mellotron, and was a forerunner of digital sampling. Keyboards like the Mellotron, Chamberlin, and Birotron were mainly used for strings, choirs, brass, and flutes, sounds not easily reproduced on the synthesizers of that era.

The major innovation of the Birotron is that it stores its sounds using 8-track tape loops, which allows it to play the sounds indefinitely, a great improvement from the 8-second limit of the Mellotron and Chamberlin. This also allows for dynamic and gradual changes in sound tones over time. A 10-minute tape loop could start off as a violin sound and gradually thicken into a viola or cello. A single repeating drum sound could gradually morph into several drum tones. Sound effects could change over time from the sounds of a stream to birds chirping. Sound collages could be made by combining tapes of various flutes, cellos, choirs, sound effects etc. This use of tape loops from 8-track cartridges also allows a Birotron owner to record their own tapes, and have a series of multiple instruments across the keyboard in the register they wished.

Another improvement is a separate attack and decay envelope for each note (like a VCA on analogue synthesizers) that allowed each note on the keyboard to independently begin and sustain. Notes could come in instantly or gradually over time — swelling in volume over a minute. Notes could decay quickly or slowly fade out, or infinite sustain could be achieved – giving the illusion that the instrument is playing itself. A ten turn pitch knob allows the sounds to be vastly speeded up or slowed down. The drawback was that the actual attack of a note had been lost in this system, and the electronic attack and decay were essential to recreate it.

The attack, sustain, and 10 turn pitch features allow for effortless creation of ominous stacked sound swells and pitch bends reminiscent of Mike Pinder's Mellotron work on "Have You Heard" (1969), and Rick Wakeman's Mellotron work on "I Get Up, I Get Down" from Close to the Edge (1972). By varying the attack and decay controls while playing — sounds, notes, and chords could be stacked upon, blended, sustained, and then suddenly morphed by changing the 4 position track selector. The keyboard action also allows the user to play as fast as they want to, having a very light touch. This allowed the player to create both a dynamic sound, and do fast runs the way a symphony might actually play. This was not always easy to do with the Mellotron or Chamberlin. These combined features plus a lighter weight and small size attracted huge interest from a large number of prominent rock and pop musicians of that time.

Beginnings 
Unable to afford a Mellotron, Dave Biro invented this instrument for personal use in early 1974.  When Dave's manager, Ed Cohen first heard the prototype at a Blackwood club engagement, he was stunned – the mixed strings were better than either of the two Mellotrons in Connecticut at the time. Ed arranged to show it to Rick Wakeman in October 1974 after a concert performance in Connecticut. Wakeman played it backstage noting it sounded "more mellow than a Mellotron", and realizing it allowed for more variety in playing styles because there was no worry about the tape running out. Wakeman was so impressed by the indefinite tape loop idea that he asked Biro if he'd like to "make some money with this thing" and offered to fund its manufacture. It was developed in 1975 by Birotronics, Ltd which was one of Wakeman's Complex 7 businesses. The Packhorse Road Case company was also part of Complex 7.

Demand
The Birotron was introduced in advertisements to the music world in 1976. Costing an estimated US$1,500–$3,000 along with the promise of tapes available cheaply at music stores, it was offered as an alternative to the more expensive (and occasionally unreliable) Mellotron and Chamberlin. Interest and customer orders flooded in from musicians worldwide. These included Vangelis, Keith Emerson (Emerson, Lake & Palmer), Elton John, Rod Argent's music store, Uriah Heep, Roger Whittaker, John Lennon, Paul McCartney, Linda McCartney, The Beach Boys, Rod Stewart, The Faces, Led Zeppelin, Captain & Tennille, Gary Wright, Dudley Moore, Patrick Moraz, Chicago, Ian McLagan, Synergy, Tangerine Dream, Edgar Froese, Klaus Schulze, and Yes. Over 1000 orders (totalling over 1 million dollars in sales) were eventually received for the proposed B-90 model.

Various famous musicians visited the factory to see and hear the Birotron. Among these were Dudley Moore, Linda McCartney, and Paul "Doc" Randall. Christopher Franke of Tangerine Dream ordered one after trying it at the Frankfurt Music Exhibition, and many musicians such as John Lennon, Captain and Tennille, and John Paul Jones sought out Dave Biro or his management to be among the first to obtain one when they realized the demand was high. Many other music business executives such as Guy Barris and Derek Green of A&M Records also came to see it, some travelling thousands of miles.

The market for the Birotron was in some part due to negative experiences musicians had working with the Mellotron and the Chamberlin in a live concert setting. It was thought that having tapes protected inside the 8-track cartridge casings rendered them immune from the effects of humidity, smoke, fog machine residue, and temperature changes. In conversations with Dave Biro and his management, Toni Tennille is alleged to have said: "Finally someone has perfected the Mellotron and Chamberlin designs".

Production 
Despite the skilled talents of the manufacturing team, (such as Emerson/McCartney Moog technician Phil Pearce who designed the attack / decay electronics), and a man by the name of 'Roger Rogers' who worked on furthering the electronics, tape process, design, and production engineering,  delays in actual production arose due to issues that became time consuming to solve properly. These included international voltage considerations, tape head alignment, and fitting 8-track tapes into a smaller and extremely robust case. The vertical mount of the tape cartridges initially made tapes prone to problems like jamming and wandering. Smaller tape loop lengths helped surmount this. Although the problems were solved it meant that essentially the B-90 Birotron was not made to a price and expensive metals and components were used in its manufacture. Wakeman stated in a 1978 interview with Keyboard magazine that the Birotron would have an extremely low profit margin because of it.

The use of expensive components, combined with fees for legal patents (to cover at least two versions of it, and a loop recording process which eliminated thumps in loop points), plus hiring musicians and locations to record sounds for the tapes, made the Birotron project an increasingly expensive venture.

The instrument was also made of rather unique parts, as detailed in Dave Biro's Birogram, a 1977 public relations release from Birotronics:

Sound library recordings 
An entire orchestral sound library was recorded for the Birotron. These sounds included violin and viola sections, brass, cellos, various flutes, organs, recorders, choirs etc. The London Symphony Orchestra, and Nottingham Town Choirs were involved in making these recordings. Rick Wakeman himself recorded the organ sounds from a church organ both The Rolling Stones and The Who had used. Despite the years of work from 1975 through 1977 and over 1,000 orders from musicians worldwide, no Birotron was ever commercially offered for sale.  In the end, only a handful of musicians actually received a Birotron. Among this number were Klaus Schulze with (Earthstar), Tangerine Dream, Rick Wakeman and Dave Biro (who lost one unit after Birotronics went bust and his house was repossessed).

Sounds 

It is unclear how many sounds were put onto 8-track tapes for use in the machine. Some sounds that have been found on tapes are 'mixed choir', 'violin', 'organ', 'cello', 'flute', 'viola section', 'mixed strings', and 'mixed brass'. There are probably more as three different versions of the instrument were produced.

These sounds (when played from unmagnetized / uncorrupted tapes) have characteristics of the Mellotron and Chamberlin, having both brightness and warm mid-range depending on the instrument sound and the analogue recording itself.

Physical evidence exists suggesting that there may be no Birotron left at all with a complete, fully working, unmagnetized tape set. Many found tapes and 8-track tape cartridges themselves are so worn, damaged and delicate, that they exist as mere remnants more than functional parts.

Birotron replacement tapes were never issued. This rendered any surviving tapes to be worn and eroded by original overuse as far back as the early 1980s. Because of this, and the fact that it was never isolated in any recordings, it is not known for certain what the Birotron sound exactly sounded like. Only one unmagnetized tape set is known to exist and still provide a partially accurate representation of Birotron sounds. This tape set was distributed to Dave Biro by Birotronics managing director Peter Robinson in the late 1970s and never used commercially.

Models 
In total, Birotronics made an extremely limited number of these instruments. There were two British made "model A" versions of Biro's original prototype, along with two prototype versions of the B-90. The B-90 model itself was the "pre-production prototype" and it's estimated that twelve were made. A mockup - prototype "C" version funded by Rudkin-Wiley Co. (investors / owners in Pepperidge Farm Foods / Air Shield manufacturing for trucks) came after the Birotronics business bankruptcy in 1979. This model (using some parts from the original prototype and a missing B-90) was never completed due to the 1981 recession in the USA and only one unfinished and incomplete version of this exists.

Number manufactured 
No one actually knows for certain how many Birotrons were made. David Biro says only 17 were made, including the original and the four aforementioned prototypes. Rick Wakeman claims there could be no more than 35 (27 unassembled and partially assembled units and only eight complete and assembled working B-90 models). Another ex-Birotronics source believes only 13 B-90 machines were ever assembled. It is unlikely that the mystery of how many were actually made will ever be solved. Only two Birotrons are thought to exist today.

Discrepancies are somewhat explained by the fact that parts did exist in Birotronics inventory to make at least 20 machines, and that being in the beta test phase, the serial numbers on the assembled B90's may not have been in sequential order. For example, it's quite possible that the first two B90 pre-production prototypes were considered as #001 and #002 without ever being labelled as such because they were just cabinetless test models.  Dave Biro also claims that he received Birotron #008 in 1977, after asking for #007, and then later again received another #008 as a gift in the 1990s after the first #008 had been disposed of during foreclosure of his home. One of the #008 Birotrons may have been intended as #003 or #004.

What is known for certain is that no serial number higher than #015 has ever been found.

Renewed interest in 1990s and 2000s 
The Birotron had renewed interest in the early 1990s because of its relation to the Mellotron and Chamberlin. Although analogue tape instruments had experienced a rebirth through painstaking restorations, sample library creation, and then widespread use again on records, the whereabouts of surviving Birotrons remained a mystery. Fervent searches by musicians and collectors turned up nothing.
Only those with an early history of business involvement with Mellotronics or Birotronics could offer even a tenuous lead on where to locate a Birotron, one person  stating having not even heard the word 'Birotron' in almost two decades.

In the 1970s two units were destroyed during durability tests. An estimated five were damaged and thrown away, but it is unknown if the two destroyed units were included in this number. In the early 1990s, ex-Birotronics director Peter Robinson disposed of the surviving unbuilt Birotrons, saying regretfully in 2007: "At the time I couldn't see them making a comeback ... I never thought there would be any future interest ... if only I knew ..."

Rick Wakeman also laments the passing of the Birotron saying: "I don't have any of them! ... I don't have one. I would like to have one, I must admit, I'd love to have one." Wakeman owned a total of four Birotrons, and used them successfully on the Yes Going for the One and Tormato tours to replace his double Mellotron last used on the Going for the One album. Wakeman recalled in a 1999 interview that two Birotrons were stolen, two were left damaged beyond repair, and one Birotron was sold privately for somewhere between $35,000 and $50,000 ($51,556.56 and $73,652.23 in 2017 dollars). This is the highest recorded price ever paid for a Mellotron-type instrument. It is estimated that only five or six Birotrons are now left in existence and of this number, only two, possibly three (if the third one still exists) are known to be complete machines.

Downfall 
Two major factors led to the Birotron's demise. The most direct cause was a lack of necessary and consistent funding. The Birotron also suffered from poor timing. Originally intended for release in the mid-1970s, it was delayed until shortly before the arrival of the digital sampling technology (such as the Fairlight CMI) which would render it immediately obsolete in the eyes of the general consumer-musician.

The Birotron's conception in 1974 and association with art and progressive rock, (as opposed to disco, punk, or new wave), plus its use of 8-track tapes at the end of the 1970s, would also position it as a relic of a by-gone era.
In addition, Wakeman's resources were also being drained by an ongoing divorce, worsening health problems, and growing dissent within his band Yes.

Attempts to save and rescue Birotron 
In the late 1970s, and into the 1980s, Les Bradley (managing director of the Mellotron company) offered to help save the Birotron through a mutual hybrid manufacturing operation but the offer came too late. Birotronics had abandoned the idea of any commercial production as funds had run too short and it was estimated the Birotron could now never compete in the marketplace against digital synth technology.

Not wanting to give up, David Biro (who years earlier returned to the USA after signing over all Birotron production to Birotronics UK), attempted to sustain the Birotron project by designing another model that overcame the lengthy manufacturing challenges in the British versions and might be more viable. This "model C" version (the Birotron Polyvox) invested in by Rudkin-Wiley (Pepperidge Farm Foods and Air Shield products), used fewer 8-track tapes, had new sounds, and would have included digital technology, and a remote keyboard that connected to the machine, but sustained funding was not available due to the 1981 recession. Throughout 1981, the recession worsened and funds for the project had completely drained. Dave Biro was left homeless and on the streets by Christmas 1982. Dave Biro explains in the documentary movie Mellodrama (2008): "I couldn't even afford bankruptcy after I lost my home and everything, and that, as far as I was concerned, was pretty much the end of the Birotron."

"World's rarest musical instrument" 
Both Rick Wakeman and David Biro were financially ruined during the project as an estimated £50,000 (upwards of £322,500 today) disappeared into it.
Today the Birotron is considered most likely the "world's rarest musical instrument" - being intended for factory mass production, having been used successfully on records and tours,
but now - so extremely few in number and impossible to find as noted in a 2007 Believer Magazine article.

Birotronics USA director of sales and marketing, Ed Cohen states that even back in the 1970s he never even saw any B-90 Birotrons himself, and that he used flyers and descriptions of the machine when making sales presentations in America.

By 1979, some American keyboardists and music industry professionals, still enticed by the 1976/1977 ads for the Birotron, had begun quests looking for it through business management and sales agents, and in music stores around the country, only to be told nothing had come in or had ever been seen. Concerned about what was happening, A&M Records business executive Derek Green journeyed to the Birotron factory to personally ask Rick Wakeman  "What's happened to the Birotron?"

In a 1979 issue of Keyboard magazine, the constant frustrated question of when and where can musicians get a Birotron? was listed as the most 'Frequently Asked Question' to editors of the magazine.

Rick Wakeman also comments on the Birotron in a 2010 interview with Metal Discovery saying "They are unbelievably collectable; they really are."

EarthStar's keyboardist Craig Wuest also comments on the sound in a 2010 Hartford Courant interview saying "I was taken by the Birotron because it doesn't sound like anything else, it just doesn't."

The Birotron's designation as the "world's rarest musical instrument" would not be only for the 5 or 6 surviving units (of which only 2 are known completed instruments), but also because its rarity was caused by natural circumstances and not artificial low production as an intended collectable. It is also the only sole instrument within its own "technology type" - legally 'sui generis', as a tape loop keyboard instrument, (unlike the Mellotron and Chamberlin which used finite lengths of tape.)
The Birotron also likely remains the only instrument in the world with an entire sound library that's never been digitally salvaged. Four sounds have emerged as digital samples from a surviving Birotron, but all are of extremely poor quality, being taken from partially erased and magnetized 8-track tapes playing at the wrong speed.
With only four incomplete sound samples from faulty tapes playing at incorrect motor speeds (due to improper settings of the 10-turn pitch knob), accurate software-based Birotron sounds continue to remain unobtainable for musicians. Only the surviving original Birotrons with some assembly of unused or unmagnetized (clear sounding) tapes are considered representative. Just one incomplete and unmagnetized tape set now exists. This tape set was originally distributed by Birotronics UK managing director Peter Robinson to David Biro in the mid-1970s and restored over a two-year period for use in a Birotron demonstration video. The surviving tape set is a worn but lone example of sounds that were never otherwise distributed or used commercially despite Rick Wakeman's direct involvement and plans for them.

Streetly Electronics has a tape set available that features the Birotron Choir which is substantially better than any digital samples offered so far, though it's a post-2000 creation for use in Mellotrons, and does not represent or resemble the Birotron B90 sound.

Birotron use in concerts 

Dave Biro and Rick Wakeman are the only known confirmed musicians to use the instrument live. Dave Biro used the original prototype with his band Blackwood from 1974 to 1976. Rick Wakeman used three or four B-90 models throughout 1977 and 1978 for the Yes Going for the One, and Tormato tours. It was also used during Tangerine Dream's 1978 Cyclone tour. It has not been seen in a live concert since 1979, but four Central New York keyboardists, Craig Wuest, Carl Goodhines, John “Synthpunk” Castello and Peter Hyrnio, used it live periodically with various local bands, 'Terror Firma, in the mid 1980s, performing local shows. The Birotron used was on loan from one of the band's friends, Craig Wuest, of Earthstar fame. Wuest explained he was given the B-90 by Klaus Schulze of Tangerine Dream. 
This Birotron later found itself among a collection of rare keyboards belonging to a New York recording studio owner who later sold it and many other rare pieces to a collector in England.

Birotron recordings 
The Birotron B90 model was only ever known to be used on record by three bands in its heyday. The first musician to use it in a commercial recording was Rick Wakeman. The Birotron appeared on the Yes albums Tormato (1978, deep and compressed in the mix), the live Yesshows (1980), and Wakeman's solo album Criminal Record (1977). It also appears on three albums by the band Earthstar: French Skyline (1979), Atomkraft? Nein, Danke! (1981), and Humans Only (1982).

The Birotron also appears on two Tangerine Dream albums: Force Majeure (1979, featuring the male choir and violin sounds throughout the album), and Hyperborea (1983) showcasing the male choir sound again. This is likely the most audible recording of the Birotron male choir and would also be historically notable for being the very last recorded appearance of this sound. These were the only known appearances of Birotron on record during its era.

The Birotron (now suffering deteriorated sound due to tape damage) re-appeared once again 11 years later on the track "Lift" by Dave Kean on the obscure 1993 Mellotron tribute: The Rime of the Ancient Sampler. The exact same Birotron unit (#007) also appeared once more 7 years later on the song "Nickel Plated Man" by Eleni Mandell on the 1999 album Wishbone.

Recordings of Biro's original prototype and the later model C version remain unreleased, or are now non-existent, and no further appearances of any Birotron have appeared since. Essentially, the Birotron has made just two known reappearances in almost 35 years.

Serial numbers of three units have been historically traced to recordings: #005 (formerly owned by Christopher Franke of Tangerine Dream), #007 (formerly owned by Wakeman), and #006 (Earthstar). It is also highly possible (but unconfirmed) that the Earthstar Birotron appears on Klaus Schulze's 1977 Mirage album, doing the endless choir sounds in "Velvet Voyage" and "Crystal Lake". The Birotron is not credited on the record but Earthstar's Craig Wuest claims the rich choir sounds are indeed an undocumented Birotron recording.

It is unknown for certain if Tangerine Dream - "Loop Mellotron" (credited to Christopher Franke) on the late 1970s albums Stratosfear (1976) and Cyclone (1978) is a reference to Birotron #005 or to their Mellotron T550 model which contained looped tapes they made themselves. The Mellotron T550 model was apparently manufactured from 1981 to 1983. If the manufacturing dates are accurate then the Birotron is the "Loop Mellotron".

Lastly the Birotron appears on the Mellodrama (2008) movie documentary soundtrack with two well-worn but worthwhile 1970s progressive rock era recordings made by inventor Dave Biro.

The Birotron's looped sounds can be described as somewhat similar to the sounds of the Orchestron and keyboard section of the Optigan but have a far cleaner Mellotron- or Chamberlin-like timbre because of the tapes.

The unique attack and decay systems for each individual note and the ten turn pitch knob (for changing tape speed) make Birotron sounds shimmering, haunting, and occasionally unrecognizable in the very few recordings that feature it. Because of this ability to morph and change the tonal qualities of the taped instruments, and the fact it's impossibly rare, most people would not usually recognize the sound of a Birotron when they heard it.

No audio demonstration of each Birotron sound was ever known to exist.

Despite the Birotron's reputation for being enigmatic and elusive, the instrument and its history continues to fascinate and intrigue musicians, historians, and writers, appearing as a feature in major magazine, book, and newspaper articles as well as a recent documentary on the Mellotron and Chamberlin.

References

External links 
 Eight Track Heaven - Birotron page featuring an interview with Rick Wakeman
 Don Tillman's Web Site - featuring links to the Birotron patents
 Streetly Electronics Mellotron Tape Library - a sample of the Birotron Choir
 Our Prayer - a Birotron version of "Our Prayer" from Brian Wilson's SMiLE solo album
 Mellotron Cousins - Short article on the Birotron with some unique photographs
Dave Biro Interview NAMM Oral History Library (2013)

Electric and electronic keyboard instruments
Analogue samplers